Henry Sillito (1 July 1901 – 17 December 1993) was an English footballer who made 67 appearances in the Football League playing for Lincoln City and Merthyr Town. He played as an outside left. He began his career in non-league football in his native north-east of England with Chester-le-Street and Washington Colliery, and was on the books of Chelsea, without representing that club in the league, before finishing his career in the Midland League with Grantham.

References

1901 births
1993 deaths
Sportspeople from Chester-le-Street
Footballers from County Durham
Association football forwards
Chelsea F.C. players
Lincoln City F.C. players
Merthyr Town F.C. players
Grantham Town F.C. players
English Football League players
Midland Football League players
English footballers